The Nowood River (also known as Nowood Creek) is a river in the U.S. state of Wyoming. The -river rises in the Bridger Mountains on the southeastern side of the Bighorn Basin. The stream runs north through the foothills of the Bighorn Mountains and past the town of Ten Sleep where it is joined by Tensleep Creek. The river then flows out of the Bighorn mountains to join the Big Horn River near Manderson. Local tradition relates that a group of men arrived on the river and found no wood to construct a fire, thus the name "No wood".

See also

Notrees, Texas

References

Rivers of Wyoming
Tributaries of the Yellowstone River
Bodies of water of Washakie County, Wyoming
Rivers of Big Horn County, Wyoming